Lee Tung Street, known as the Wedding Card Street by locals, was a street in Wan Chai, Hong Kong. The street was famed in Hong Kong and abroad as a centre for publishing and for the manufacturing of wedding cards and other similar items.

As part of an Urban Renewal Authority (URA) project, all interests of Lee Tung Street were resumed by and reverted to the Government of Hong Kong since 1 November 2005, and subsequently demolished in December 2007. The demolition was seen by many as causing irreparable harm to the cultural heritage of Hong Kong.

The site was redeveloped as a luxury shopping and housing development. As with all other URA projects, no original tenants have been resettled on site.

History 
The street was known for its printing industry, and Wan Chai was a longtime host of the headquarters of the Hong Kong Times, Ta Kung Pao and Wen Wei Po. In the 1950s, print shops began to gather in Lee Tung Street between Johnston Road and Queen's Road East. Rumours had it that the government of Hong Kong mandated this in order to easily monitor illegal publication.

The poet and translator Dai Wangshu also established a short-lived bookstore in Lee Tung Street in the early 1950s.

In the 1970s, the print shops also began producing wedding invitations, lai see, fai chun, and other items, for which they became famous in the 1980s. Hundreds of thousands of Hong Kong people visited the shops there to order their wedding cards, name cards, and traditional Chinese calendars.

The Urban Policy Initiative/ Objective of Lee Tung Street Urban Renewal Timeline

 1998 – The Land Development Corporation announced the Development Scheme Plan including The Lee Tung Street/McGregor Street project (H15)
 1998 – The Town Development Board approved the Development Scheme Plan.
 1999 – The Chief Executive in Council approved the Development Scheme Plan
 2001 – the Urban Renewal Authority was established and replaced the Land Development Corporation since Land Development Corporation's efficiency in redevelopment was not satisfactory.
 2003 – Urban Renewal Authority conducted the occupancy survey
 2004 – Urban Renewal Authority released the letter8 for the land and property acquisition in the affected area of H15 Renewal Project.
 2005 – The H15 group submitted her own renewal proposal i.e. Dumbbell Proposal (啞鈴方案), which was awarded silver award by the Hong Kong Institute of Planners, but was rejected by the Town Planning Board (城規會)
 2007 – H15 group failed to appeal the decision made by Town Planning Board in the Appeal Board Panel (Town Planning).
 2009 – Urban Renewal Authority started a public tendering for the H15 Urban Renewal Plan.
 2009 – The Urban Renewal Authority announced that Sino Land Company and Hopewell Holdings Limited got the joint development contract, enabling them to develop the H15 Urban Renewal Plan.

The procedures and institutions involved in the redevelopment plan

 Urban Renewal Authority submits a development scheme plan to the Town Planning Board
 Town Planning Board Secretariat process the submission
 Town Planning Board decides if the plan submitted is suitable for exhibition or not.
 Town Planning Board arranges a publication of such development scheme plan in the Gazette
 Town Planning Board publishes the development scheme plan
 Urban Renewal Authority publishes the development scheme in the Gazette
 Urban Renewal Authority carry out a freezing survey in the affected area
 Town Planning Board considers objections to the development scheme plan.
 Town Planning Board submits the development scheme plan to the Chief Executive in Council
 Chief Executive decides to approve the DSP or not.

Redevelopment 

In 2003, the Urban Renewal Authority announced it would spend HK$3.58 billion to redevelop Lee Tung Street and McGregor Street, an area covering . According to an authority spokesman, up to the end of June 2005, more than 85 percent of the 647 affected homeowners on Lee Tung Street had agreed to accept compensation offers of HK$4,079 per square foot. The purchase of the land was expected to be completed early 2006. The street was duly demolished starting in December 2007. In its place will stand four high-rise buildings and one underground car park, and new shops fitting in with the proposed image of the street as a "Wedding City". That means the old shops there, which were mostly small businesses and family-run, had to move elsewhere to continue operating, facing high rent and losing old customers.

On behalf of the H15 Concern Group, architect Christopher Law produced a counter-proposal known as the "Dumbbell Proposal" which would have preserved the signature six-storey tong lau in the middle part of the street. However, despite the proposal and strong protests by residents (including a three-day hunger strike by 60-year-old shop owner May Je) and other activists, the URA and the government went on to demolish the street as planned.

Timeline of Lee Tung Street Renewal scheme
 1998: The Land Development Corporation announced the Development Scheme Plan including The Lee Tung Street/McGregor Street project (H15)
 1998: The Town Planning Board approved the Development Scheme Plan
 1999: The Chief Executive in Council approved the Development Scheme Plan 
 2001: the Urban Renewal Authority was established and replaced the Land Development Corporation since Land Development Corporation's efficiency in redevelopment was not satisfactory
 2003: Urban Renewal Authority conducted the occupancy survey 
 2004: Urban Renewal Authority released the letter 8 for the land and property acquisition in the affected area of H15 Renewal Project
 2005: The H15 group submitted her own renewal proposal i.e. Dumbbell Proposal (啞鈴方案), which was awarded silver award by the Hong Kong Institute of Planners but was rejected by the Town Planning Board (城規會) 
 2007: H15 group failed to appeal the decision made by Town Planning Board in the Appeal Board Panel (Town Planning)
 2009: Urban Renewal Authority started a public tendering for the H15 Urban Renewal Plan
 2009: The Urban Renewal Authority announced that Sino Land and Hopewell Holdings Limited got the joint development contract, enabling them to develop the H15 Urban Renewal Plan

Procedures and institutions involved

 Urban Renewal Authority submits a development scheme plan to the Town Planning Board 
 Town Planning Board Secretariat process the submission
 Town Planning Board decides if the plan submitted is suitable for exhibition or not
 Town Planning Board arranges a publication of such development scheme plan in the Gazette 
 Town Planning Board publishes the development scheme plan
 Urban Renewal Authority publishes the development scheme in the Gazette
 Urban Renewal Authority carry out a freezing survey in the affected area
 Town Planning Board considers objections to the development scheme plan.
 Town Planning Board submits the development scheme plan to the Chief Executive in Council

Controversy

Shop Owners and Residents
Some of the active residents were very concerned about the H15 renewal scheme plan and later on H15 Concern Group was formed and May Yip to Mrs. Kam, the shop owners, are the active members in the concern group. They, people living or doing business in the affected area, very much concerned about the loss of relationships within the community that had taken years to establish. In fact, in order to tackle the dissipation of the relationship within the community, the H15 Concerns Groups proposed a Dumbbells Plan in 2005 and being rejected in 2007 by the Town Planning Board.

Apart from the concern pertaining to the community relationship, the economic concern is also one of the worries. One of the shop owners, Mr. Luk, due to the H15 program, moved his shop from Lee Tung Street to Wan Chai Road and faced 80% decrement in business income comparing with the days when he was running his printing business in Lee Tung Street. Mr. Luk is not the only one. In fact, former shop owner Ms. Chan, complained in 2016, after moving from Lee Tung Street to Tai Wong Street East, she faced 40% decrement in business income comparing with her income in bygone days in Lee Tung Street.

The other economical concern is about the underestimated compensation given by URA. During the reconstruction of Lee Tung Street, the compensation given by the Urban Renewal Authority to the flat owners was $4000 per square feet. However, the selling price of a flat, after the reconstruction, in Avenue Walk is $23000 per square feet in 2013. The URA was criticized for depriving the flat owners by paying an unreasonably low compensation to the flat owner in the affected area i.e. 1.8 billion in total while Urban Renewal Authority is foreseeably gaining $3.4 billion by this project.

Wan Chai District Council

Wan Chai District Council, in 2004 published her position paper Our Urban Renewal of Wan Chai emphasizing the following four principles. Firstly, renewal does not equal to reconstruction. It is ridiculous to demolish a community of vitality for the purpose of reconstruction. The New and the old can be able to exist in the same community. Secondly, people oriented with various choices is paramount. Respect mankind's diversity of needs and provide corresponding choices to the flat and shop owners but not long confined to monetary compensation. Thirdly, showing Appreciation to community and cultural identity. We should respect the individual's connection in the community and protect such relationship. Lastly, public participation. The affected people, due to the renewal programs, shall be able to participate in deciding the development direction, procedures and principles.

In fact, Wan Chai District Council commissioned the University of Hong Kong conducting a survey. That survey showed more than 70% of people living in the affected area agreed to reconstruct the Lee Tung Street. Wan Chai District Council also approved the Lee Tung Street's master layout plan as well as the plans of solving the concerning traffic problems in the affected area. The Wan Chai District Council also urged the Urban Renewal Authority starting the reconstruction work as soon as possible.

Government and URA

According to the press release of the Progress of Lee Tung Street Project announced by the then chairman of Urban Renewal Authority Cheung Chun Yuen, the new project would take the wedding industry as the main theme of the project since the original Lee Tung Street was famous for traditional wedding industry. After redevelopment, H15 Concern Groups challenged the promise that making wedding as renewal theme as chain stores and famous brand dominated the new street. Due to the expensive rent, original shop owners can hardly move back. Also, tenants have to fulfill the term that building 'First Class Shopping Premises' which designed by URA and land developer. Nothing about the wedding theme has been mentioned in the lease.

URA replied that three pre-war tenement houses in the renewal project are kept for the wedding industry with Eighty-nine square meters reserved as 'Chinese and western wedding traditions museum'. However, Peter Lee Siu-man from Conservancy Association criticized that no social enterprises and original shop owners should afford the monthly rent of three rebuilt tenement houses.

Lee Tung Avenue

In June 2013, the Urban Renewal Authority (URA) began accepting applications for new commercial tenants on the street, and formally announced the new name "Avenue Walk" (囍歡里). The Chinese name was a pun on the phrase "I Like You". This pun resulted in widespread derision. Finally, Sino Land, Hopewell Holdings and URA announced the name changed to "Lee Tung Avenue" (利東街) in October 2015, using the street's old Chinese name.

On 28 November 2015, the place was reopened as an outdoor shopping boulevard with one storey of basement mall. And the MTR Wan Chai station exit D was opened in December 2017.

Evaluation

In 2010

The extent to which the H15 project meets the 12 objectives spelled out in URS is set out in the table below (prescribed in the Study Report: The Achievements and Challenges of Urban Renewal in Hong Kong):

If the redevelopment turned out to be as planned in 2010, we could safely conclude the H15 project met most of the objectives spelt out in the URS, the remaining controversial part was related to the social aspects. In terms of preservation of social network, while URA has made provisions to enhance such efforts, given the fact that all the residents and commercial operators have left the site without any existing explicit arrangement for their return, the chance of re-establishing such social network was uncertain. By 2016, as shown above in bold, some of the intended achievement were not delivered.

New social movement- "flat-for-flat" and "shop-for-shop" compensation

After the preservation of Lee Tung Street (together with the protest against the demolition of the Star Ferry and Queen's Pier and the recent controversy about the construction of Express Rail Link), the public are much more concerned on the preservation of local community, local characteristics, cultural assets and collective memories. The struggle made by H15 Concern Group and its supporters is now usually considered as one important landmark of the "new social movement", which stresses on postmaterialist values like culture and heritage. The experience in Lee Tung Street also nurtured a batch of activists in the society, most remarkably Eddie Chu, and led to more sophisticated tactics in future social movements. Other issues in urban renewal, including community participatory planning, owners' participation in redevelopment, "flat-for-flat" and "shop-for-shop" compensation are all reflected in the case of the H15 project.

See also
 List of streets and roads in Hong Kong

References

External links

Gallery
Gallery
《灣仔街紙》－市區重建策略檢討公民參與文件 | Wan Chai 'Street post' – Urban regeneration strategy public consultation paper (via Project SEE)

Wan Chai
Roads on Hong Kong Island